Carl Potter Voss (January 6, 1907 – September 13, 1993) was an American ice hockey forward in the National Hockey League. He played for several teams between 1926 and 1938. He would later become a referee, and was inducted into the Hockey Hall of Fame in 1974 as a builder.

Playing career
Voss was born in Chelsea, Massachusetts and he moved to Canada when he was a teenager. In 1925-26, Voss helped Queen's University's hockey team reach the Memorial Cup finals where they were defeated 2-1 by the Calgary Canadians. After a short stint with the Toronto Marlboros in the Ontario Hockey Association, Voss was signed by Conn Smythe of the Toronto Maple Leafs in 1926-27 of the National Hockey League. He played only 14 games with the Leafs as he spent much of his time in the minors for five years. Voss was a leading player with Toronto's affiliate teams. He played in the Canadian Professional Hockey League with the Toronto Falcons and the London Panthers and the Buffalo Bisons of the International Hockey League. Voss led the Bisons to back to back to back championships in 1930-31 and 1931-32. Voss led the IHL in scoring in 1931-32 and was also named to the First All-Star Team.

In 1932-33, Voss finally earned a full-time NHL roster spot with the New York Rangers. Ten games in, he was sold to the Detroit Red Wings where he had a great season, scoring 20 points in 38 games. Voss became the league's first rookie of the year award winner that season. In 1933-34, Voss played in eight games with the Red Wings before being traded to the Ottawa Senators for cash and player Cooney Weiland. From then on, he was traded back and forth in the NHL. He saw action with the St. Louis Eagles, New York Americans, and the Montreal Maroons before settling in with the Chicago Blackhawks in 1937-38. He helped the Blackhawks reach the Stanley Cup finals that season. 
He scored the Stanley Cup-winning goal in game four against the Toronto Maple Leafs. With that, Voss won his first Stanley Cup. Next season, Voss injured his knee in training camp and the injury turned out to be career ending. Voss retired in the fall of 1938 after playing in 261 games in the NHL.

Football
Few realize that Voss was also an excellent football player. While at university he played 4 seasons (1924 to 1927) with the Queen's Golden Gaels. This included a victory in the 1924 12th Grey Cup. Voss has his name engraved on the Grey Cup for this season.

This makes Voss, along with Lionel Conacher and Joe Miller, one of only three players to have their name engraved on both the Stanley Cup and the Grey Cup; Leo Dandurand won Stanley Cup as owner Montreal Canadiens 1924 (also Manager), 1930-31 & Grey Cup Montreal Allouettes 1949 President (also Owner); Harald Ballard won Stanley cups with the Toronto Maple Leafs in 1962-63-64-67 as co-owner/Vice President, and Grey Cup 1986 with the Hamilton Tiger-Cats as owner/president. Normie Kwong is on the Grey Cup as a player 4 times and on the Stanley Cup once as an owner/general manager, while Wayne Gretzky is on the Stanley Cup as a player 4 times and once on the Grey Cup as an owner.

Post-playing career
After retirement, Voss joined the U.S branch of the Canadian Cycle and Motor Company (CCM). For the next ten years, Voss was their main principal agent associated with hockey teams across the United States. He also served as a referee during his stay with the CCM as he refereed games in the American Hockey League, California Hockey League and various college games. Eventually Voss, moved up the ranks of hockey administration and he replaced Jim Hendy of the United States Hockey League and he also became a consultant to on-ice officials. After the USHL suspended operations in 1951, he joined the St. Louis Flyers of the AHL as manager and coach while continuing to work as a consultant to on-ice officials. His administrative qualities caught the eyes of the National Hockey League and he was offered the job of referee-in-chief of the NHL. During his 15-year tenures as referee-in-chief he implemented a wide range of changes to the league's officiating structure. Voss scouted the minor leagues for potential NHL officials and under his watch, the number of on-ice officials increased from 10 to 23. He was inducted into the Hockey Hall of Fame in 1974 as a builder for his contribution to ice hockey.

Awards and achievements
Grey Cup champion 1924.
IHL champion in 1931 and 1932.
Selected to the IHL First All-Star Team in 1932.
IHL leading point scorer in 1932.
Calder Memorial Trophy winner in 1933.
Stanley Cup champion in 1938
Inducted into the Hockey Hall of Fame in 1974 as a builder.

Career statistics

Regular season and playoffs

Transactions
 February 16, 1927 – Signed as a free agent by the Toronto Maple Leafs.
 October 10, 1929 - Traded to the Buffalo Bisons by the Toronto Maple Leafs with Wes King for Gord Brydson.
 October 4, 1932 - Traded to the New York Rangers by the Buffalo Bisons for Lorne Carr and $15,000.
 December 11, 1932 - Traded to the Detroit Red Wings by the New York Rangers for cash.
 November 26, 1933 - Traded to the Ottawa Senators by the Detroit Red Wings with cash for Cooney Weiland.
 September 22, 1934 - Transferred to the St. Louis Eagles after the Ottawa Senators franchise relocated.
 October 15, 1935 - Claimed by the Detroit Red Wings from the St. Louis Eagles in Dispersal draft.
 October 16, 1935 - Traded to the New York Americans by the Detroit Red Wings for Pete Kelly.
 September 6, 1936 - Traded to the Montreal Maroons by the New York Americans for Joe Lamb and $10,000.
 December 6, 1937 - Signed as a free agent by the Chicago Blackhawks.
 September 30, 1938 - Suffered career-ending knee injury in training camp.

External links
 

1907 births
1993 deaths
Sportspeople from Chelsea, Massachusetts
American men's ice hockey centers
Buffalo Bisons (IHL) players
Calder Trophy winners
Chicago Blackhawks players
Detroit Red Wings players
Hockey Hall of Fame inductees
Ice hockey players from Massachusetts
London Panthers players
Montreal Maroons players
New York Americans players
New York Rangers players
Ottawa Senators (1917) players
Queen's Golden Gaels football players
St. Louis Eagles players
Stanley Cup champions
Toronto Falcons (CPHL) players
Toronto Maple Leafs players
Toronto Marlboros players